Sovetashen may refer to:
Nubarashen, Armenia
Zangakatun, Armenia